Coptocercus rubripes is a species of Cerambycidae that occurs in Australia.

References

 

Beetles of Australia
Elaphidiini